Flame is a fictional character appearing in American comic books published by Marvel Comics.

Fictional character biography
Flame tried to burn down Dazzler's apartment, and she hired Power Man and Iron Fist to find out who was behind it. Flame caught Dazzler and tried to kill her, but she was able to defeat him.

Ferocia, Blue Streak, Flame, and Kingsize later broke Ricadonna from Sing Sing. Flame and his allies waited in the Corporation HQ on Hart Island and he trained his shapeshifting abilities, and Ricadonna told them that they would finish their job now. During the Heroes for Hire's attack on the Corporation's facility Flame fought Orka, and was later carried by Shang-Chi into an escape tunnel before it exploded.

Powers and abilities
Flame is an expert arsonist. His costume is fireproof and has goggles to protect his eyes from the intense glare of the fires he lights. The gloves of his costume are fitted with miniature flame-throwers and can shoot fireballs from the fingertips. He also wields a "fire-sword" which is a blade of super-hot flame.

His method of transportation is his motorcycle, which has been redesigned to make no noise when running.

Skrull organs transplanted into his body by the Corporation allowed him to shapeshift.

References

External links
 

Comics characters introduced in 1983